The list of shipwrecks in 1888 includes ships sunk, foundered, grounded, or otherwise lost during 1888.

January

February

March

April

May

June

July

August

September

October

November

December

Unknown date

References

1888